Mo Farah is a British distance runner.

Mohamed Farah may also refer to:

Mohamed Farrah Aidid (1934–1996), Somali military commander
Mohamed Farah (footballer) (1961–2020), Somali footballer
Mohamed Dini Farah (born 1943), Djiboutian politician